The N762 is a regional road in the Belgian province of Limburg between Maaseik and the Dutch border beyond . Locally, the road is therefore largely better known as the Weertersteenweg.

References 

762